A Nightmare on Elm Street 4: The Dream Master is a 1988 American fantasy slasher film and the fourth installment in the A Nightmare on Elm Street franchise. The film was directed by Renny Harlin and stars Robert Englund (as Freddy Krueger), Lisa Wilcox, and Danny Hassel. Following the death of Nancy Thompson, Krueger reappears in the dreams of Kristen Parker, Joey Crusel, and Roland Kincaid. After completing his revenge against the families who killed him, Krueger uses Kristen's best friend, Alice Johnson, to gain access to new victims in order to satiate his murderous needs. The film is a sequel to A Nightmare on Elm Street 3: Dream Warriors (1987). The Dream Master is often popularly referred to as "the MTV Nightmare" of the franchise.

The Dream Master was released on August 19, 1988, and grossed $49.4 million at the domestic box office on a budget of $6.5 million, which made it the highest-grossing film in the franchise in the United States until the release of Freddy vs. Jason, a crossover with the Friday the 13th franchise, in 2003. The Dream Master received mixed reviews from critics. It was followed by A Nightmare on Elm Street 5: The Dream Child (1989).

Plot
In 1988, a year after the events of the previous film, Kristen, Kincaid, and Joey have been released from Westin Hills and are back to their lives as normal teenagers with their families. However, Kristen believes Freddy Krueger will come back and when she dreams that she is in Freddy's old boiler room, she summons Joey and Kincaid into the dream. To reassure Kristen that Krueger is dead, Kincaid and Joey take her to Krueger's boiler room in the dream and show her that the boiler is cold. The next day, Kristen meets up with her boyfriend, martial arts enthusiast Rick Johnson, and their friends—Rick's shy and quiet sister Alice, Sheila, an asthmatic genius, and Debbie, an athletic girl who dislikes bugs. Kincaid and Joey confront Kristen at school about the dream. They tell her that their days of fighting in dreams are over, and if she continues she might accidentally bring Krueger back.

That night, Kristen stays awake to keep herself from dreaming, but Kincaid falls asleep. He awakens in a junkyard, where Freddy has been accidentally resurrected. Kincaid fights Freddy, but Freddy overpowers and kills him. Joey falls asleep in his room and sees a model from one of his posters swimming in his waterbed. Freddy pulls Joey into the waterbed and kills him. At school the next day, Kristen learns that Kincaid and Joey were found dead. She later tells Rick, Alice, and Alice's crush Dan Jordan about Freddy, and vows to avenge Kincaid and Joey.

Kristen realizes that her mother has put sleeping pills in her dinner but falls asleep as she tries to run out of the dining room. Kristen starts to dream; Freddy overcomes her attempts to repel him and forces her back to his home. Since Kristen is the last of the Elm Street children still alive, Freddy goads Kristen into summoning one of her friends into the dream, so that his fun can begin anew. She calls Alice into her dream, and Freddy throws Kristen into his boiler but before she dies, Kristen gives Alice her dream power. Alice wakes up with the sense that something is wrong and takes Rick to Kristen's house. When they arrive, they see that Kristen's bedroom is on fire with her in it.

Later, Alice falls asleep during class and inadvertently brings Sheila into her dream. Freddy kills Sheila and makes it look like an asthma attack. Rick starts to believe Alice, but the following day, he has a dream where an invisible Freddy attacks him in a martial arts dojo. Rick fights him, and manages to knock his bladed glove off. However, the glove levitates and stabs him, killing him.  With each death, Alice changes—she gains the abilities and personalities of her dead friends. She makes plans with Debbie and Dan to fight and kill Freddy together, but when her father keeps her in, Alice falls asleep. Through Alice, Freddy stalks Debbie, transforms her into a cockroach, and crushes her in a roach motel. Using Debbie's temper, Alice tries to ram Freddy but collides with a tree in reality, injuring Dan. As Dan is rushed into surgery, Alice returns home and readies herself to join him and face Freddy.

In a dream, Alice rescues Dan, and the two find themselves in an old church. Dan gets injured in the dream which prompts his surgeons to wake him up. Alice now has to face Freddy alone. Freddy has the upper hand due to his experience, but she uses her friends' dream powers against him. When he is about to win, Alice remembers a nursery rhyme called "The Dream Master". She recites it and forces Freddy to face his own reflection which causes the souls within him to revolt. The strain tears Freddy apart. Alice's friends' souls are released and leave Freddy as a hollow husk. Months later, Dan and Alice are on a date when Dan tosses a coin into a fountain. For a moment, Alice sees Freddy's reflection in the water, but she ignores it. Dan asks her what she wished for, but Alice does not tell him as they walk away from the fountain.

Cast

 Lisa Wilcox as Alice Johnson. Wilcox was not initially considered for the lead role of Alice (see below for more details). In this film she plays a more timid version of the character who would later return in the sequel.
 Danny Hassel as Dan Jordan. Hassell was not expecting to be cast and assumed that the producers giving his character the same name as himself meant they were not that interested in his role in the script. Nonetheless Hassell, along with Wilcox, would return in the sequel the following year.
 Robert Englund as Freddy Krueger and nurse (without make-up). Englund returned for his fourth appearance in the role of Krueger; the time-loop sequence of Alice and Dan trying to save Debbie is often quoted by him as his favourite in the whole series.
 Tuesday Knight as Kristen Parker. Knight assumes the role of Kristen which had been played by Patricia Arquette in the previous film. Knight would contribute the film's soundtrack and, in 2010's documentary Never Sleep Again, other cast members suggest that her prominence was the result of a relationship with director Renny Harlin something both Harlin and Knight deny.
 Brooke Theiss as Debbie Stevens. Theiss would later star with original Elm Street star Heather Langenkamp in ABC sitcom Just the Ten of Us. Theiss was pleased that her character later became an action figure.
 Ken Sagoes as Roland Kincaid. Sagoes returns from the previous film although he recalled in 2010 telling his friends not to buy any popcorn and go straight into the film as his onscreen appearance was minimal.
 Rodney Eastman as Joey Crusel. Eastman, like Sagoes, returns from the previous film and also meets his demise relatively early in the picture. 
 Andras Jones as Rick Johnson. Jones plays Rick, the brother of Alice and boyfriend of Kristen. Jones would later recall being stalemated by the rest of the cast after shooting had completed and hinted at a possible conflict with director Renny Harlin.
 Toy Newkirk as Sheila Kopecky. Newkirk plays Sheila, a maths and science expert who helps Debbie with her Maths homework. An asthmatic, she is suffocated by Krueger midway through the film. Newkirk recalled in Never Sleep Again that she was asked to redub all her lines after initial filming in order "to sound more black".
 Nicholas Mele as Mr. Dennis Johnson. Mele plays Rick and Alice's alcoholic father; his character was slated to die in this film in a cut scene where Krueger forces his head through a fridge door. The scene was cut for time constraints and Mele returned in the next film. 
 Brooke Bundy as Elaine Parker. Bundy was surprised to be asked back after her character appeared to be killed by Krueger at the conclusion of the previous film; it was later suggested that this was a dream of Kristen's. Elaine inadvertently kills Kristin when she spikes her food with sleeping tablets, allowing Krueger to attack her whilst dreaming.
 Linnea Quigley as soul from Freddy's chest 

Robert Shaye appears uncredited in a cameo role as Alice's teacher talking about a positive and a negative gate of dreams and Aristotle's dream philosophy.

Production

Development
Franchise originator Wes Craven presented his own pitch for the fourth Elm Street film, but producers Sara Risher and Robert Shaye turned it down, instead going with the 'Dream Master' pitch as a progression of the Dream Warriors concept from the previous film. Risher explained that: Initially, I approached Wes for an idea for the fourth film. I always go to Wes first each time. His idea was illogical. It was about time travel within dreams that broke all the rule of dreams. We decided not to go with that. When we decided to go with [William] Kotzwinkle's 'Dream-master' idea, which we thought was terrific, I told Wes we were doing that. Shaye felt that Craven's idea did not have the impact the producers were looking for. Craven and his writing partner Bruce Wagner were later contacted about doing rewrites for the script, but turned down the offer as Craven felt that they should have been approached as artists of the original material. Brian Helgeland was at New Line Cinema around Christmas 1987 about a script named Highway to Hell, a pitch that was turned down by them and would not be realized until 1992; the company was desperate to get Nightmare 4 going as they lacked both a script and a director for the film at the time. Mike De Luca begged Helgeland to have a try at it and come up with a script within two weeks; he went to his parents' house and finished the script within nine days, sending it to New Line Cinema with FedEx. Helgeland's script was a rewrite of William Kotzwinkle's original script. Ken and Jim Wheat were brought in next for further polishes; the Writers Guild credited the shooting script to the Wheat brothers.

In an interview with Midnight's Edge, director Tom McLoughlin said that after completing Jason Lives: Friday the 13th Part VI, New Line offered him the job on The Dream Master. His one caveat was that he wanted creative control. The studio could not adhere to the demand, specifically because they had already begun filming without any director. McLoughlin said, "When I finished Friday, I was offered Nightmare 4 and went to New Line, met with them, and I said, 'I love Freddy, I would love to do one of these, but I really want to do what I just did, where I had creative control'," he explained. "And they go, 'Well, we're already shooting.' 'What?' 'Yeah, we're already shooting, we're shooting like two different units for the visual effects' and something else, puppets or something. And I said, 'Without a director?' 'Yeah, we kind of know how we're going to make these things.' And I went, 'That's not the way I work.' So I turned it down, which of course made (Nightmare 4 director) Renny Harlin's career."

Eventually, the director's work was given to Finnish-born Renny Harlin, who had previously directed only two low-budget feature films: a Finnish action film Born American in 1986 and an American horror film Prison in 1987. Rachel Talalay claims that she and the other producers felt that since the audience was so familiar with Freddy at this stage, it would be harder to replicate the scare factor of the first two films; instead they decided to continue in the same vein of Dream Warriors rather than focus on pure horror. Harlin felt that Freddy had become the James Bond of the series, the one the audience roots for, saying: We've reached a point where the audience sees Freddy as the hero. They come to these movies to hear his funny lines and see him do those amazing things. And because of that popularity, I'm faced with showing Freddy in a more heroic light and giving him more screen time. People will still fear him, but they will also be cheering him on.

Rick Johnson was originally slated to die in a Freddy-induced elevator accident in the dreamworld. According to the producers, this scene had to be cut for budget concern reasons and was rewritten with the infamous karate dojo scene seen in the theatrical picture.

Casting

The role of Kristen Parker in Dream Warriors had been the debut role for Patricia Arquette, but was recast with actress Tuesday Knight for the sequel; producer Sara Risher said she was disappointed at the time that Arquette could not reprise her role, commending her as an "integral part to Nightmare 3" and as well-liked by the rest of the crew. In Assault of the Killer B's: Interviews with 20 Cult Film Actresses it is stated that "Patricia Arquette reportedly fought the [horror genre] label, turning down a hefty offer to reprise her heroine role, instead favoring more dramatic roles and becoming a respected thespian in the Hollywood community". Knight had been the first new actor to be cast for the film other than the four returnees from the previous film. Returning actors Rodney Eastman and Ken Sagoes expressed disappointment that the character of Kristen had to be recast and of the defaulted reunion with former co-star Arquette, while Knight on her part has admitted to having felt out of place due to the recasting. On the auditioning for Alice, Lisa Wilcox recalls that "I did a screen test with Tuesday Knight, who'd already been cast as Kristen Parker. We did the scene where we're sitting outside the school talking about having matching luggage. Then I did another screen test with Brooke".

Over 600 actresses auditioned for the role of Alice, which was eventually given to Lisa Wilcox. Wilcox had previously auditioned for a role in the previous film, Dream Warriors, but failed to land it. In Never Sleep Again: The Elm Street Legacy, director Harlin describes that he and the producers were looking for "somebody [he] could make seem timid and vulnerable in the beginning and who can then in a believable way become kind of like Sigourney Weaver in Aliens or something like that", and that "[he] found lot of sort of hardcore tough chicks but [he] could never believe they could be weak and vulnerable – then [he] found a lot of mousy girls that when they try to be tough and strong capable, they fell on their face." According to Wilcox, the casting directors failed to find the right actress initially, and so went through the pile of rejects that she had been put in. The reason for this first rejection, as she was told initially by the casting manager, was that she looked too much like "a cheerleader", and was deemed too pretty to play the part of the introverted, mousy girl Alice started off as. Wilcox then countered by toning down her looks as much as she possibly could: I basically wimped myself out. I wore no makeup, wore my worst color (which is yellow) and just showed up looking like hell. Their reaction was, "Is that Lisa Wilcox?" After they got over their shock, they gave me the role.

Ellie Cornell has claimed that she was in line for auditioning for a lead role in the A Nightmare on Elm Street franchise in 1988. In Horror Films of the 1980s, she describes that New Line Cinema was looking for an 'Ellie Cornell prototype', a 'girl next door', but she had already landed the role of Rachel Carruthers in Halloween 4: The Return of Michael Myers shortly before the auditioning for the role in Dream Master took place. Lezlie Deane, who later starred as Tracy in Freddy's Dead: The Final Nightmare, also auditioned for roles in Dream Master and Dream Warriors.

Filming

The creative process was bogged down by the untimely 1988 Writers Guild of America strike, running from March 7 to August 7, 1988, forcing Harlin and the producers to improvise much during the filming. Lisa Wilcox and Andras Jones wrote their own dialogue for Alice and Rick after the death of Kristen while watching their old home videos, such as "I saw it happen in my dream". Many of the nightmare scenes were made up from ideas that Harlin came up with rather than from the writers' script.

This film features the car junkyard set from A Nightmare on Elm Street 3: Dream Warriors. This set was conceptualized by production designer Mick Strawn, who worked as art director and handled effects on the previous film. Strawn also came up with the truck crash scene and the kaleidoscope hallway. The junkyard set is the only set used in more than one film. The set was built and filmed at a landfill in Pacoima, California.

According to the Never Sleep Again documentary, producer Rachel Talalay recounted a meeting between director Renny Harlin and James Cameron; Cameron enquired how Freddy was being resurrected for this film to which Harlin replied "a dog pisses fire".

Music

Film score
There are two different releases of the music featured in the film. One is the music score, composed by Craig Safan, while the other was a soundtrack album with mostly rock or pop-oriented songs by various artists. The film score by Safan along with every other score in the film series was re-released in 2017 on the label Death Waltz Recording Company in an 8-CD box set named A Nightmare On Elm Street: Box Of Souls.

Soundtrack album
There were ten songs on the soundtrack album.
 Sea Hags – "Under the Night Stars" 
 The Angels – "Standing Over You"
 Go West – "Don't Be Afraid of Your Dreams" (Played over the end credits. A sped up, more rock-like instrumental version is heard when Alice prepares for her final battle with Freddy.)
 Divinyls – "Back to the Wall" (Played while Kristen is driving to Rick and Alice's house.)
 Jimmy Davis & Junction – "My Way Or The Highway"
 Vinnie Vincent Invasion – "Love Kills" (Played in the jukebox, after hearing about Joey and Kincaid's death.)
 Vigil – "Therapist"
 Blondie – "Rip Her To Shreds"
 Love/Hate – "Angel"
 Craig Safan – "Resurrection" (This a suite from his instrumental score.)

Other songs
Nine songs were played during the film that were not on the soundtrack album. Tuesday Knight, who acted in the film, contributed the song Nightmare to the film's soundtrack. She did not know until she watched Dream Master in the theater that it been chosen to be the actual title/intro song. Nightmare does not appear on the official compilation released for the film. The master record of this song, previously thought for many years to have been lost or destroyed, has since been "uncovered in a box deep within the bowels of Warner Brothers" according to Knight.

 Tuesday Knight – "Nightmare" (Played at the opening credits.)
 Dramarama – "Anything, Anything (I'll Give You)" (Played during Rick and later Alice's martial arts training montages.)
 The Fat Boys – "Are You Ready for Freddy" (Played over the end credits.)
 Billy Idol – "Fatal Charm" (Played during Joey's final nightmare.)
 Joe Lamont – "Pride and Joy" (Played on the jukebox while Debbie serves Dan.)
 Nick Gilder & Time Machine – "Big House"
 Sinéad O'Connor – "I Want Your (Hands on Me)" (Played during Debbie's death and end credits.)
 Blondie – "In the Flesh" (Played on the jukebox when Dan comes to the diner to talk to Alice about Freddy.)
 Girl Talk – "Baila Baila" (Played during Debbie's arrival at school.)

Producer Rachel Talalay would recall in 2010 that the inclusion of Sinéad O'Connor's song, "I Want Your (Hands on Me)" (from her debut album The Lion and the Cobra), was a contentious issue as the licence fee for the song was twice that of the others due to O'Connor's emerging success on MTV; producer Bob Shaye eventually relented and the song was included twice in the picture.

Music videos
Since the Nightmare on Elm Street series was popular, many of the songs on the soundtrack had music videos:
 The Fat Boys' "Are You Ready for Freddy" music video featured Robert Englund. The story line of the video is that one of the Fat Boys inherits the Elm Street house on the condition that he has to stay in it for the night. The video includes Freddy rapping and audio of Heather Langenkamp's line "don't fall asleep" from the original film. This music video was on the bonus disc The Nightmare Series Encyclopedia of The Nightmare on Elm Street Collection, released by New Line Platinum Series on September 21, 1999.
 Vinnie Vincent Invasion's "Love Kills" music video features scenes from the film.

Reception

Box office
The film was released on August 19, 1988, on 1,765 theaters in North America. The film ranked number one on its opening weekend and grossed $12,883,403. On the second weekend, the film still ranked number one and grossed $6,989,358. It was in first place on the third weekend, then at second, fourth, and sixth in the next three weeks until it dropped out from the top ten list on the seventh weekend at number eleven. The film grossed $49,369,899 at the US box office and was the 19th-highest-grossing film of 1988. It was the highest-grossing Nightmare on Elm Street film until Freddy vs. Jason was released in 2003. It is currently the third-highest-grossing film in the Nightmare on Elm Street franchise.

Critical response

The review aggregator website Rotten Tomatoes reports a 53% approval rating based on 30 reviews, and an average rating of 5.02/10. The site's critical consensus reads, "A Nightmare on Elm Street 4: The Dream Master marks a relative high point in this franchise's bumpy creative journey, although the original remains far superior." On Metacritic the film has a weighted average score of 56 out of 100, based on 10 critics, indicating "mixed or average reviews".

Upon its release, critic Kevin Thomas of the Los Angeles Times praised the story line, performances, and special effects, stating that the film: "is by far the best of the series, a superior horror picture that balances wit and gore with imagination and intelligence. It very effectively mirrors the anxieties of the teen-age audience for which it is primarily intended." Thomas then went on to commend Wilcox's portrayal of Alice, stating, It matters not to Freddy that these kids' parents had nothing to do with his torching. In essence, however, the film is about how a shy, lovely teenager named Alice (Lisa Wilcox) with a widowed alcoholic father gradually gathers the courage to assert herself in taking on Freddy—and in the process wins the love of the handsomest boy (Danny Hassel) in her school. If the nightmare sequences are impressive with their Inferno-like images, the film's young cast is no less so. Nightmare 4 provides Wilcox with an exceptionally challenging screen debut. While criticizing the plot for being derivative of the previous films, critic John H. Richardson of Los Angeles Daily News described the film's special effects as "downright brilliant, matching and even improving on the amazing effects in A Nightmare on Elm Street 3: Dream Warriors."

Accolades
 1990 Saturn Awards
 Best Director – Renny Harlin (nomination)
 Best Horror Film (nomination)
 Best Supporting Actor – Robert Englund (nomination)
Fantasporto Awards 1989
 International Fantasy Film Award for Best Film – Renny Harlin (nomination)
9th Golden Raspberry Awards
 Razzie Award for Worst Original Song – Vigil for the song "Therapist" (nomination)
Sitges - Catalan International Film Festival
 Best Special Effects (winner)
 Best Film (nomination)
Young Artist Awards
 Teenage Choice for Best Horror Motion Picture (winner)
 Best Young Actor in a Horror or Mystery Motion Picture – Rodney Eastman (nomination)
 Best Young Actor in a Horror or Mystery Motion Picture – Andras Jones (nomination)
 Best Young Actress in a Horror or Mystery Motion Picture – Brooke Theiss (nomination)

See also

 List of ghost films
 List of monster movies

References

External links

 
 
 
 

1988 films
1988 horror films
Nightmare Elm Street 4
American teen horror films
Adaptations of works by Wes Craven
Films about child abuse
Films about nightmares
Films about psychic powers
American films about revenge
Films set in Ohio
American sequel films
1980s English-language films
American slasher films
Films set in 1988
Insomnia in film
A Nightmare on Elm Street (franchise) films
Films directed by Renny Harlin
Films scored by Craig Safan
Films with screenplays by Brian Helgeland
Films shot in Los Angeles
New Line Cinema films
1980s American films